Battle of Anandpur

 Battle of Anandpur (1700), fought between the armies of the Sikh Guru Gobind Singh and the Mughal forces in 1701
 Battle of Anandpur (1701), fought between the armies of the Sikh Guru Gobind Singh and an allied force of the Rajas of the Sivalik Hills in 1701
 First Battle of Anandpur (1704), fought between the armies of the Sikh Guru Gobind Singh and Mughals forces who were supported by the Rajas of the Sivalik Hills in 1704
 Second Battle of Anandpur (1704), fought between the armies of the Sikh Guru Gobind Singh and an allied force of the Rajas of the Sivalik Hills in 1704